EOH Group is a South African company specialising the provision of technology services to businesses and government.

Contoversy
EOH Group executive, Jehan Mackay, was implicated in a bribery scandal to obtain South African government contracts between 2015 and 2016. In 2020 company representatives gave testimony to the Zondo Commission on its involvement in government corruption and state capture.

References

External links
 

Companies based in Johannesburg
South African brands
Companies listed on the Johannesburg Stock Exchange